Islam Mohamed Zaky (born 18 January 1988) is an Egyptian professional footballer who plays for Selangor United in the Malaysia Premier League.

References

External links
 Profile at Thaipremierleague.co.th
 

1988 births
Living people
People from Monufia Governorate
Egyptian footballers
Expatriate footballers in Thailand
Expatriate footballers in Cambodia
Expatriate footballers in Myanmar
Expatriate footballers in the Maldives
Islam Mohamed Zaky
Islam Mohamed Zaky
Islam Mohamed Zaky
Association football forwards
El Shams SC players
Tala'ea El Gaish SC players
Islam Mohamed Zaky
Islam Mohamed Zaky
Muktijoddha Sangsad KC players
Sheikh Russel KC players
Egyptian expatriate footballers
Expatriate footballers in Bangladesh
Egyptian expatriate sportspeople in Malaysia
Expatriate footballers in Malaysia